Gorta (English: "Extreme Want" or "Hunger") was one of Ireland's longest-running international development organisations. It was established in 1965, as 'Gorta: The Freedom from Hunger Council', in response to a call by the Food and Agriculture Organization’s (FAO) Freedom from Hunger Campaign (FFHC) for member countries to raise public awareness and financial support for long-term agricultural development. Following a merger with Self Help Africa in July 2014, the organisation operated in Ireland until May 2018 as Gorta-Self Help Africa. Thereafter the organisation has operated as Self Help Africa.

"Gorta UK" is an affiliate of Gorta and raises funds from public donors within the UK.

History
Gorta was established in 1965 as Gorta: The Freedom from Hunger Council of Ireland after the Food and Agricultural Organization (FAO) called upon the Irish government to create a hunger-related agency that would raise general awareness and public support for long-term agricultural development. Initially set up by the Department of Agriculture and Fisheries, Gorta subsequently moved to the remit of the Department of Foreign Affairs in 1979, and in 1998 Gorta relinquished its formal links with the Irish Government to become a completely independent NGO with its head office in Dublin.  Gorta remains the Irish affiliate organisation of the FAO.

The word Gorta, meaning "extreme want" or "hunger" in the Irish language, was chosen for the new body to reflect both the work of the organisation in combating hunger and as a deliberate reference designed to reflect Ireland's own legacy of hardship during the Great Famine known in Irish as An Gorta Mór.

Over its five-decade history Gorta has funded small and large-scale agricultural development projects in close to 50 countries across Africa, Asia, South and Central America.  In later years, a majority of projects were focused on Sub-Saharan Africa, with the exception of funding for a large-scale rehabilitation centre for differently abled children in Tamil Nadu, India.

Work
Since 1965, Gorta's work focused on eradicating hunger by supporting both small and large-scale agricultural development projects. The very first project in 1965 was the establishment of a village settlement and farmers’ training school in rural Tanzania.

Over five decades Gorta's approach to the issue of hunger has evolved. Initial support focused on providing inputs in the form of improved seeds, livestock, machinery or infrastructure, to projects run by missionary groups or Irish volunteers. The very first volunteer was John Hay, who worked on a livestock project in Southern India in 1967.

As the growth in indigenous development organisations increased in number and technical capacity, Gorta's model in the early 1990s shifted away from sending Irish volunteers and supporting missionary groups to working alongside local experts and partner NGO groups within the countries themselves. With the shift in who Gorta was working with also came a move away from the model of providing inputs to a more comprehensive approach to modern development. Focusing on maximising the potential of hard-pressed communities through skills exchange and the encouragement of innovation and entrepreneurship.

Funding
Gorta's work in Africa is funded largely through regular giving from public donors in Ireland and the UK, in addition to money raised through sponsored events, annual campaigns, and by revenue generated by a network of charity shops located throughout the Republic of Ireland.

The first Gorta charity shop, known originally as the ‘Gorta Gift Shop’ opened on South Frederick Street in Dublin in 1970. In July 2014, Gorta opened its 11th shop in Newcastle West, Limerick.

In 2014, Gorta's ‘Just a Little Extra’ fundraising campaign won an award for Acorn Marketing at the An Post Smart Marketing Awards in the Smartest Fundraising/Not for Profit category.

World Food Day
Since 1981, Gorta has hosted an annual conference in Dublin on October 16 to mark the FAO's World Food Day. Each year a separate theme is selected by the FAO and Gorta invites notable personalities and experts to present and to lead discussions based around that theme. Notable past speakers have included Bob Geldof, Mary Robinson and Father Niall O'Brien (priest).
 
The World Food Day theme for 2013 was "Sustainable Food Systems for Food Security and Nutrition" and the keynote speaker was Olivier de Schutter – The UN Special Rapporteur on the Right to Food.

Merger with Self Help Africa
In July 2014, Gorta merged with another long-running Irish development organisation Self Help Africa to form Gorta-Self Help Africa - the identity that the charity retained in Ireland until 2018. The organisation operated as Self Help Africa in all markets outside of the Republic of Ireland. The merged organisation represents one of the largest non-profit agricultural organisations in Ireland and Britain.

Self Help Africa was established in 1984 by Noel McDonagh and Father Owen Lambert in the immediate aftermath of the 1983–85 famine in Ethiopia. The organisation works with rural communities in ten African countries and has its headquarters in Dublin, Ireland, UK offices in Shrewsbury, London and a US office in New York City. In 2007, Raymond Jordan became Chief Executive Officer of Self Help Africa. In 2013 it reported an annual turnover of €9.5million. It is stated that the merged entity will invested around €19m in projects across Africa in 2014.

The merger was reported upon positively by both the Irish media and Dóchas, the umbrella association of Irish Non-Governmental Development Organisations.

References

External links
Official Website

Development charities based in the Republic of Ireland